Kyle Jacobs may refer to:

 Kyle Jacobs (songwriter) (1973–2023), American country music songwriter, vocalist, guitarist and pianist
 Kyle Jacobs (footballer, born 1986), English footballer
 Kyle Jacobs (soccer, born 1991), South African footballer
 Kyle Jacobs (cricketer) (born 1998), South African cricketer